UPX (Ultimate Packer for Executables) is a free and open source executable packer supporting a number of file formats from different operating systems.

Compression 

UPX uses a data compression algorithm called UCL, which is an open-source implementation of portions of the proprietary NRV (Not Really Vanished) algorithm.

UCL has been designed to be simple enough that a decompressor can be implemented in just a few hundred bytes of code. UCL requires no additional memory to be allocated for decompression, a considerable advantage that means that a UPX packed executable usually requires no additional memory.

UPX (since 2.90 beta) can use LZMA on most platforms; however, this is disabled by default for 16-bit due to slow decompression speed on older computers (use --lzma to force it on).

Starting with version 3.91, UPX also supports 64-Bit (x64) PE files on the Windows platform. This feature is currently declared as experimental.

Decompression 

UPX supports two mechanisms for decompression: an in-place technique and extraction to temporary file.

The in-place technique, which decompresses the executable into memory, is not possible on all supported platforms. It has the advantage of being more efficient in terms of memory, and that the environment set up by the OS remains correct.

The rest uses extraction to temporary file. This procedure involves additional overhead and other disadvantages; however, it allows any executable file format to be packed. The extraction to temporary file method has several disadvantages:
 Special permissions are ignored, such as suid.
 argv[0] will not be meaningful.
 Multiple running instances of the executable are unable to share common segments.

Unmodified UPX packing is often detected and unpacked by antivirus software scanners. UPX also has a built-in feature for unpacking unmodified executables packed with itself.

Supported formats 

UPX supports the following formats:
 Portable Executable (PE, EXE and DLL files):
ARM (Windows CE)
 32-bit x86 (Windows Desktop)
 64-bit x86-64 (Windows Desktop, still experimental)
 RTM32 (DOS extender, as generated by Borland C/Pascal compilers)
 COFF executables, used by DJGPP2
 a.out format, BSD i386 (removed)
 Raw 8086/DOS files:
 DOS/COM (including some binary images)
 DOS/EXE
 DOS/SYS
 Watcom/LE (used by DOS4G, PMODE/W, DOS32A and CauseWay)
 TMT/adam (as generated by the TMT Pascal compiler)
 Atari/TOS
 Linux kernel, i386, x86-64 and ARM
 Linux Executable and Linkable Format, i386, x86-64, ARM, PowerPC, MIPS
 PlayStation 1/EXE (MIPS R3000)
 Darwin Mach-O, ppc32, i386, and x86-64

UPX does not currently support PE files containing CIL code intended to run on the .NET Framework.

Notes

References

External links 

 

Free data compression software
Free software programmed in C++
EXE packers
1998 software
Assembly language software